The Roman Catholic Diocese of Salem is a diocese located in the city of Salem in the Ecclesiastical province of Pondicherry and Cuddalore in India.

History

Spread of Christianity in Salem 
St. Thomas Didymas, one of the disciples of Jesus Christ, came to India and introduced Christianity in Malabar coast in Kerala and Mylapore, Chennai in Tamil Nadu.   He came to India at the invitation of king Gundophorus an Indo-Parthian king who ruled over Kabul to spread gospel.  He converted the upper class Hindu families in Cranganore. Palayur Chayal, Niranam and Quilon. He consecrated priests from some of these families and built seven Churches in Kerala and then he came to the Tamil country to continue his preaching, incurring the wrath of the local priests. St. Thomas was killed near a Hindu shrine on the mount near Mylapore, Chennai in about 72 AD.  The Martydom of St. Thomas at Maylapore led to the rapid spread of Christianity in South India. 
The next stage in the preaching of Christianity in India began with the coming of Portuguese on the western coast of India in about 1498. AD. They occupied a few trading posts. Soon all the Portuguese trading posts along the Indian coast from Bombay to Tuticorin were made as the Catholic Christian Centres. In 1531, Goa was created the Bishopric.   
In the beginning, the Christian centres in Tamil Nadu were controlled by Goa Bishoprice. The Popes repeatedly urged the Portuguese Kings to make it their duty to send missionaries to newly discovered areas for evangelization. 
In response to the call of the Popes, the Portuguese kings sent a number of secular and religious priests to India. In the 17th century, a new department known as Propaganda Fide was established in order to send the Franciscans, the Jesuits, the Dominicans, Theatines and Augustinians missionaries to India for evangelization. 
Christianity spread in Konkan, Kanara, Malabar coasts and later to Tuticorin, Kanyakumari, Kongu and Bara Mahal and Madurai regions.  
The beginning of the Counter Reformation and the foundation of the Society of Jesus formed a brilliant chapter in the history of the Roman Catholic Church. The Jesuit priests involved actively in spreading Gospel to many parts of Tamil Nadu. Fr. Francis Xavier was the pioneer among the Jesuits who visited Tamil Nadu.  After his arrival at Goa in 1542 AD,  he continued his evangelical works in the coastal regions of Tuticorin and Kanayakumari.

Works of Madura Mission
The foundation of Madura mission had a tremendous effect on the social history of Salem. Robert De. Nobili (1577–1656), an eminent and dedicated Jesuit was the first missionary who visited Salem to spread Christianity and founded Catholic Church there.  He entered the Jesuit order in 1595 and came to India in 1604. He reached Madurai in 1606 when it was ruled by Tirumalai Nayak (1623-1659 AD). Nobily adopted the mode of life of Hindu sanyasis in order to attract higher caste Hindus to Christianity by his adoptive method he converted many Hindu high caste into Christian faith.  As a result of his novel way of conversion, Christianity was accepted in the southern parts of Tamil Nadu by low caste and high caste people. After founding a well-known Jesuit mission at Madurai in 1606 AD, he decided to spread the gospel in the neighbouring regions.

He established congregations wherever conversion took place in large numbers. In 1623, he toured through many parts of Tamil Country. During the course of the tour he visited Truchirapalli, Senthamangalam and Salem.  In June 1623 AD he arrived at Senthamangalam the capital of Ramachandra Nayak, The Vasal of Thirumala Nakak of Madurai.  Ramachandra Nayak offered him a site to build a church and a presbytery but after consulting God in prayer, Robert de Nobili declined the offer.

At Salem Nobili met Tirumangala Nayak, the elder brother of Ramachandra Nayak and also the dethroned ruler of Senthamangalam.  Fr. Nobili followed Tirumangala, a small town in Dharampuri and baptized him there along with his family members on  25 December 1625.

On 31 July 1626. Fr.Nobili received the visit of a Pandaram hailed from the sect of Saivism and a man belonged to Valluvar caste. The latter one was impressed by De Nobili's Tamil book, "Sign of True Religion" and got himself baptized with the name "Mukthi Udayan" ( Blissful one).  His  conversion had a tremendous impact on the evangelical service rendered by Fr. Nobili in Salem region. Very soon Maramangalam became an important Christian centre with 40 neophytes. As this centre was then well established he could leave for other places to continue to preach the gospel. So he invited Fr. Martins and put him in charge of Salem, Maramangalam and Senthamangalam which numbered between 100 and 150 Christians . In 1627 he left for Tiruchirapalli. The little congregations he established grew from strength to strength. Due to the efforts of Fr. De Nobili and Fr. Antonio Vico, a church was built at Maramangalam in 1628 and another one at Salem. Subsequently, the Christian Mission centre was established in various places in Salem region Fr. Nobili also established a mission centre at koilur in Dharamapuri.  By 1665 AD, there were a large number of Catholics at Kongupatti, Ilupuli, Anaikarapalayam, Omalur, Sankagiri, Anthiyur, Mathiyampatti and Ilanagar.

Establishment of diocese
On 26 May 1930 the Diocese of Salem was erected from the parts of Salem District and from the Diocese of Kumbakonam, Diocese of Mysore and Metropolitan Archdiocese of Pondicherry

Cathedrals
St. Mary's Co-Cathedral was consecrated in 1975 as 'The Pro Cathedral of Our Lady of Victories' by Bishop Michael Bosco Duraisamy. The parish of Arisipalayam was bifurcated from Shevapet in 1953 and was erected as St. Francis Xavier's parish. The chapel of St. Francis Xavier's Minor Seminary served as the parish church till 1991. The new Infant Jesus Cathedral was consecrated on 27 November 1991, and dedicated to Infant Jesus. This magnificent Cathedral was meticulously planned and carefully constructed with strenuous efforts by late Bishop Most Rev. Dr. Michael B. Duraisamy.

Leadership
Bishops of Salem (Latin Rite)
 Bishop Henri-Aimé-Anatole Prunier, M.E.P. (26 May 1930 – 20 November 1947; Resigned)
 Bishop Venmani S. Selvanather (3 March 1949 – 17 March 1973; promoted as Archbishop of Pondicherry and Cuddalore) (Clergy of Salem Diocese) 
 Bishop Michael Bosco Duraisamy (28 February 1974 – 9 June 1999; Died in Office) (Clergy of Pondicherry Archdiocese)
 Bishop Sebastianappan Singaroyan (18 October 2000 – 9 March 2020; Resigned) (Clergy of Salem Diocese)
 Bishop Lawrence Pius Dorairaj, Apostolic Administrator of Salem (9 March 2020 - 4 August 2021) (Clergy of Madras-Mylapore and Bishop of Dharmapuri)
 Bishop Arulselvam Rayappan (4 August 2021 - Incumbent) (Clergy of Pondicherry Archdiocese)

Gallery

References

External links
 GCatholic.org 
 Catholic Hierarchy 
  Diocese website  

Salem
Christian organizations established in 1930
Salem
Christianity in Tamil Nadu
Salem, Tamil Nadu